Graeagle is a town and census-designated place in eastern Plumas County, California, United States, located along the Middle Fork Feather River in the Northern Sierra Nevada. The population was 737 as of 2010.

History

The town was founded in 1916 as a lumber town. A post office was established in 1919 with the moniker of Davies Mill.  When the mill changed ownership in the 1920s, a naming contest was held. Belle Byrne contracted the name of nearby Gray Eagle Creek to Graeagle, winning the contest and its $5 prize.  

The name of the creek may have had some connection with Edward D Baker, the "Gray Eagle of Republicanism," who was in the mining region in 1856 while stumping the state for Frémont.

Graeagle Lumber Company was owned by the California Fruit Exchange which employed hundreds in logging, lumber production and the manufacturing of box shook (boxes for picking and shipping fruit and vegetables) from the 1920s to the 1950s. Modernization closed the mill in 1956 and the box factory in 1957. The town was acquired by the West family in 1959.

Geography

Economy
Much of the economy is seasonal, catering to summer tourism, primarily second homes.

Several golf courses are in the area.

The brewery "The Brewing Lair of the Lost Sierra", is located in nearby Blairsden, as is the Plumas National Forest Beckwourth Ranger District headquarters.

As was common throughout this area of California, mining was initially done by individuals, then companies and finally by corporations whose owners often lived far away from the mines themselves. For the mines in the Graeagle area, investors were from as far away as London.

Demographics

2010
The 2010 United States Census reported that Graeagle had a population of 737. The racial makeup of Graeagle was 718 (97.4%) White, 1 (0.1%) African American, 5 (0.7%) Native American, 0 (0.0%) Asian, 0 (0.0%) Pacific Islander, 3 (0.4%) from other races, and 10 (1.4%) from two or more races. Hispanic or Latino of any race were 27 persons (3.7%).

The Census reported that 737 people (100% of the population) lived in households.

There were 392 households, out of which 41 (10.5%) had children under the age of 18 living in them, 217 (55.4%) were opposite-sex married couples living together, 20 (5.1%) had a female householder with no husband present, 10 (2.6%) had a male householder with no wife present.  There were 17 (4.3%) unmarried opposite-sex partnerships, and 1 (0.3%) same-sex married couples or partnerships. 128 households (32.7%) were made up of individuals, and 85 (21.7%) had someone living alone who was 65 years of age or older. The average household size was 1.88.  There were 247 families (63.0% of all households); the average family size was 2.30.

The population was spread out, with 70 people (9.5%) under the age of 18, 20 people (2.7%) aged 18 to 24, 61 people (8.3%) aged 25 to 44, 269 people (36.5%) aged 45 to 64, and 317 people (43.0%) who were 65 years of age or older.  The median age was 62.4 years. For every 100 females, there were 94.5 males.  For every 100 females age 18 and over, there were 94.5 males.

The homeowner vacancy rate was 6.8%; the rental vacancy rate was 28.1%.  603 people (81.8% of the population) lived in owner-occupied housing units and 134 people (18.2%) lived in rental housing units.

2000
At the 2000 census, there were 831 people, 412 households and 280 families residing in the CDP. The racial makeup of the CDP was 97.95% White, 0.48% Native American], 0.12% Pacific Islander, 0.12% from other races, and 1.32% from two or more races. 2.17% of the population were Hispanic or Latino of any race.

There were 412 households, of which 13.6% had children under the age of 18 living with them, 62.9% were married couples living together, 3.4% had a female householder with no husband present, and 32.0% were non-families. 26.9% of all households were made up of individuals, and 14.3% had someone living alone who was 65 years of age or older. The average household size was 2.02 and the average family size was 2.40.

Age distribution was 11.6% under the age of 18, 2.8% from 18 to 24, 15.9% from 25 to 44, 35.1% from 45 to 64, and 34.7% who were 65 years of age or older. The median age was 57 years. For every 100 females, there were 90.6 males. For every 100 females age 18 and over, there were 93.4 males.

The median household income was $55,385, and the median family income was $59,327. Males had a median income of $39,219 versus $24,028 for females. The per capita income for the CDP was $25,199. About 4.7% of families and 5.7% of the population were below the poverty line, including none of those under age 18 and 12.1% of those age 65 or over.

Media
Formerly, the primary local news source was the Portola Reporter, published every Wednesday. Now it appears in online form only as the Plumas News.

Government

References

See Also

 The Lost Sierra

External links
Graeagle camping, Plumas County hospitality site
Graeagle.com, Graeagle Visitor Information

Census-designated places in Plumas County, California
Populated places in the Sierra Nevada (United States)
Census-designated places in California
Company towns in California